Maanbumigu Maanavan is a 1996 Indian Tamil-language action drama film and was directed by S. A. Chandrasekhar. The film stars Vijay and Swapna Bedi, while Chinni Jayanth, Manivannan, Vijayakumar, Mansoor Ali Khan and Shrinath play other supporting roles. Music was composed by Deva. Vijay had a completely different hair and beard style, and an image makeover in this film. This was the debut film for Swapna Bedi. 

Maanbumigu Maanavan released on 12 April 1996. The songs were a big hit but the film ran for more than 50 days in theatres. The film ended as a decent hit at the box office and established Vijay as a mass hero.

Plot 
Shivaraj aka Shiva is a college student who lives with his widowed mother and sister. His friend Sundar is in love with their classmate Priya, but Priya's father, who is rich, opposes their relationship. Shiva helps Sundar and Priya to elope. Meanwhile, Sneha, the daughter of ACP Chandrabose, falls in love with Shiva. Initially Shiva rebuffs Sneha, but eventually he reciprocates her feelings.

Madhan, the son of a powerful rowdy and politician Desigan, is a notorious womaniser who lusts for Priya. He gang rapes Priya in the college library and then kills her. Shiva, Sundar and their friends decide to avenge her rape and death by their own brand of justice i.e. killing Madhan, only to be stopped by Chandrabose, who prefers to arrest Madhan and let the court decide his punishment as he does not want Shiva to end up as a criminal. A cat-and-mouse game begins between Shiva and Chandrabose regarding Madhan's fate, which culminates with Chandrabose arresting Shiva, with the aim of protecting him from Desigan and his men, who are planning to kill him, while Madhan is arrested as well.

Desigan hires a corrupt lawyer Killadi Krishnaswamy to fight Madhan's case in the court. Krishnaswamy, using crooked tactics, manages to acquit Madhan of the rape and murder charges. Meanwhile, Desigan kills Sundar as well as Shiva's mother. It is at this stage that Shiva and Chandrabose team up and plan to eliminate the trio (Madhan, Desigan and an unknown third person). Chandrabose hires Krishnaswamy to fight for Shiva in the court and acquit him of killing the three men, and then takes Shiva's place in jail. Shiva kills both Madhan and Desigan. At the court, Krishnaswamy manages to acquit Shiva by claiming that he is "mentally unstable", despite Shiva's pleas to the judge Ganapathy to convict him.

After the verdict, Shiva exposes the "third person" as none other than Krishnaswamy and kills him in front of Ganapathy for his corrupt activities. But he is sentenced to only six months imprisonment. Following his release, he reunites with Sneha and marries her.

Cast

Production 
Chandrasekhar initially wanted Devayani to pair with Vijay but she was replaced by newcomer Swapna Bedi.

Release 
The film released on 12 April 1996. Initially, Maanbumigu Maanavan was awarded with an 'A' certificate by the Indian Censor Board due to its violent action scenes. However, the committee later revised it to a 'U'certificate. The satellite rights of the film were purchased by Sun TV, however Raj TV too telecasts this film.

Soundtrack 
The music was composed by Deva, while the lyrics were written by Vaali and Kanmani Subbu.

References

External links 
 

1990s action drama films
1990s Tamil-language films
1990s vigilante films
1996 action films
1996 films
Films directed by S. A. Chandrasekhar
Films scored by Deva (composer)
Indian action drama films
Indian vigilante films